Coleophora virgatella is a moth of the family Coleophoridae. It is found from Germany and Poland to the Pyrenees, Italy and Greece. It has also been recorded from southern Russia and central Asia.

Adults are on wing from late June to July.

The larvae feed on Salvia glutinosa, Salvia pratensis and Stachys species. They create a curved, dark brown lobe case, of which the lobes untidily stick in every direction. The mouth angle is about 45°. Larvae can be found from autumn to May of the following year.

References

virgatella
Moths of Europe
Moths of Asia
Moths described in 1849